Telefacts is a Belgian current affairs programme that has been broadcast weekly on the Belgian television channel VTM since 1 February 1990. It shows documentaries about a wide variety of issues, most of them being widely known recent events. The programme is made in collaboration with VTM Nieuws and sometimes gives in-depth analysis to certain current events.

Reports purchased from foreign broadcasters are sometimes broadcast as part of Telefacts; between 2010 and 2015 a spin-off programme dedicated to these reports was broadcast, allowing the main programme to focus on domestically produced content.

The name Telefacts is a play on words, referring to the telefax, which was still a widely used means of communication when the programme began in 1990, and the programme's factual subject matter (facts), broadcast on television (tele).

External links

Flemish television shows
Belgian television news shows
1990 Belgian television series debuts
VTM (TV channel) original programming